The following is a list of events affecting American television in 2002.  Events listed include television series debuts, finales, cancellations, and new channel initiations.

Events

January

February

March

April

May

June

July

August

September

October

November

December

Programs

Debuts

Shows changing networks

Returning this year

Ending this year

Entering syndication this year

Television films

Miniseries

Television stations

Station launches

Network affiliation changes

Births

Deaths

See also 
 2002 in the United States
 List of American films of 2002

References

External links
List of 2002 American television series at IMDb

 
2000s in American television